Thomas Hewett or Hewet may refer to:
Sir Thomas Hewett, 1st Baronet (1605–1662), landowner in Hertfordshire
Thomas Hewet (1656–1726), landowner and architect

See also
Tom Hewitt (disambiguation)